Stephanotrypeta is a genus of tephritid  or fruit flies in the family Tephritidae.

Species
Stephanotrypeta brevicosta Hendel, 1931
Stephanotrypeta nigrofemorata (Munro, 1929)
Stephanotrypeta taeniaptera (Bezzi, 1923)
Stephanotrypeta vittata Freidberg, 1979

References

Tephritinae
Tephritidae genera
Diptera of Africa